Mr Gay Europe is a male beauty pageant for gay Europeans. It was founded by its former President, Morten Rudå and its current President, Tore Aasheim; and was hosted for the first time in 2005. The competition was held in Oslo, Norway and the winner was Alexander van Kempen from the Netherlands. The following year, Amsterdam was the host city.

In 2006 at Amsterdam, Nandor Gyongyosi of Hungary won the title.

Mr Gay Europe Contest 2007 was held in Budapest, August 5, as part of Pride Island Europa, Central and Eastern Europe's largest new International GLBTQ celebration. The winner was Germany's Jackson Netto.

In 2008, again in Budapest, the competition was won by Spain's Antonio Pedro Almijez.

In 2009, the competition was held in Oslo and won by Spain's Sergio Lara. In 2010, the competition was supposed to be in Geneva, Switzerland, but was cancelled. In 2011 the competition was in Braşov, Romania. The 2010/2011 winner was Giulio Spatola, from Palermo (Italy).

In 2012, the competition was held in Rome, Italy and won by Miguel Ortiz from Spain.

In 2013, the event was held in Prague and Robbie O'Bara of Ireland won Mr Gay Europe 2013. Robbie is originally from Canada of Canadian/Japanese descent and has returned to that country to start practising as a medical doctor.

In 2014, the competition was held in Austria (14 of June, Bregenz). For the first time in MGE history, the contest took the delegates on a journey through the hosting country. The finale took place in the Bregenzer Festspielhaus. Mr Gay Europe 2014 title goes home to Scandinavia with Jack Johansson of Sweden. The judging panel included Tore Aasheim, the president of Mr. Gay Europe, and Coenie Kukkuk, the Director Africa & Middle East of Mr. Gay World.

In 2015, the competition was cancelled but was rescheduled to be held in Sweden and Norway 29. July to 7. August 2016, starting in Stockholm with the Pride Parade, before journeying west to Trondheim and Oslo. Belgium’s Raf Van Puymbroeck took home the title of Mr Gay Europe 2016.

In 2017, the competition was held in Stockholm, Sweden and won by Matt Rood from England.

In 2018, the competition was held in Warsaw and Poznan in Poland, and was won by Enrique Doleschy from Germany.

Previous winners

2018 in Poznan, Poland

2017 in Stockholm, Sweden

2016 in Oppdal, Norway

2014 in Vienna, Austria

2013 in Prague, Czech Republic

2012 in Rome, Italy

2011 in Braşov, Romania 

Although an edition for 2010 was supposed to be held in Geneva, Switzerland, the edition got cancelled and no contest held in this year.

2009 in Oslo, Norway

2008 in Budapest, Hungary

2007 in Budapest, Hungary

2006 in Amsterdam, The Netherlands

2005 in Oslo, Norway

See also
International Mister Gay

Footnotes

External links

The Budapest Sun
The Spenborough Guardian
Interviews with Mr GayEurope 2010 contestants (ru|en)

Recurring events established in 2005
LGBT beauty pageants
Gay events
Transgender beauty pageants
Mr Gay World
Continental beauty pageants